Sergey Vladimirovich Yastrzhembsky, born December 4, 1953, Moscow, is a Russian Federation politician and diplomat.

He was Yeltsin's and Putin's Spokesperson.

Biography
Descends from the szlachta of the Grand Duchy of Lithuania. Educated at Moscow State Institute of Foreign Relations (MGIMO) - allegedly 'a recruiting ground for the KGB' - under the Soviet Union's Foreign Ministry in 1976, and as a postgraduate at the Soviet Academy of Sciences' Institute of the International Workers' Movement in 1979, where he earned a Ph.D. in history.

In 1992-1996, he was in the diplomatic service, holding different positions including the post of the Russian ambassador to Slovakia. Yastrzhembsky was promoted to the diplomatic rank of the Ambassador Extraordinary and Plenipotentiary — the highest diplomatic rank in the Russian Federation — by the Decree of the President of Russia of 20 June 1994 No. 1287.

Since 13 August 1996, he worked as President Boris Yeltsin's chief spokesperson. Yastrzhembsky was promoted to the rank of the 1st class Active State Councillor of the Russian Federation — the highest federal state civilian service rank in the Russian Federation — by the Decree of the President of Russia of 10 March 1997 No. 204. On 12 September 1998, he was dismissed from the post of the President's chief spokesperson.

After leaving the Presidential Administration of Russia and vacation in Africa, where he met his future wife, Yastrzhembsky began to work in the Government of Moscow. The period of his service in this state body lasted 2 years, from 1998 to 2000.

Since 20 January 2000, Yastrzhembsky worked as President Vladimir Putin's chief spokesperson on the conflict in Chechnya for 14 months before winning promotion in March 2001 to head the Kremlin's Information Policy Department, co-ordinating all Putin's external communications.

In 2004, Putin made him presidential special envoy to the EU in Brussels, where he earned a reputation for maladroit statements. That post Vedomosti on 8 May 2008 reported said would become defunct when he left the post after Putin stepped down. Towards the end of his posting to Brussels, Yastrzhembsky warned the EU that recognizing Kosovo's independence would open a "Pandora's box" of separatism in Europe.

His job was being scrapped – unlike other Putin aides, he was leaving the Kremlin's service of his own accord, a source close to the Russian foreign ministry told the Western-owned Moscow business daily, adding: "His dismissal is probably connected with the future redistribution of powers between the president (Dimitry Medvedev) and the prime minister (Putin).". In an interview with Vladimir Pozner, Yastrzhembsky told that Putin  was extremely dissatisfied with his notice of resignation and became angry with him.

Currently he is involved in shooting a series of documentary films on traditional African peoples, entitled "Beyond the Passage of Time".

Yastrzhembsky speaks English, French, Italian, Portuguese, Slovak.

References

External links

 Official English webpage at Kremlin, with biography
 Spokesman sacked by Yeltsin

1953 births
Living people
Russian people of Polish descent
Moscow State Institute of International Relations alumni
Ambassadors of Russia to Slovakia
Ambassador Extraordinary and Plenipotentiary (Russian Federation)
Kremlin Press Secretaries
1st class Active State Councillors of the Russian Federation